The 2022 American Athletic Conference men's soccer tournament was the 10th edition of the tournament. The tournament champion FIU Panthers earned the American Athletic Conference's automatic berth into the 2022 NCAA Division I men's soccer tournament.

Seeding 

Seeding was determined by regular season conference record points per game.

Bracket

Schedule

First Round

Semifinals

Final

References

External links 
 American Athletic Conference Men's Soccer
 American Athletic Conference Men's Soccer Tournament Central

Tournament
American Athletic Conference Men's Soccer Tournament
American Athletic Conference men's soccer
American Athletic Conference Men's Soccer Tournament
American Athletic Conference Men's Soccer Tournament
Sports in Miami